Red lunulae is characterized by a dusky erythema confined to the lunulae, as has been reported in association with alopecia areata.

References

Conditions of the skin appendages